Fluentgrid (formerly Phoenix IT Solutions) is an Indian software product company, founded in 1998. It provides digital transformation services for power, water, and gas distribution utilities and smart cities and communities. The company received the 2012 IBM Beacon Award and was the winner of the Fierce Innovation Award 2015.

In 2016, Fluentgrid placed 14th in the Deloitte Technology Fast 50 Awards, recognising it as one of the fastest growing technology businesses in India. It was also selected for Deloitte Technology Fast 500 Asia Pacific ratings. It was formerly known as own as Phoenix IT Solutions. It is a signatory to the United Nations Global Compact.

History 
The company was originally founded by Gannamani Sesha Murali Krishna as Phoenix Cybertech India Pvt Ltd in 1998. In 2001, the company was renamed as Phoenix IT Solutions Ltd. Furthermore, In December 2015, the name of the company was changed to Fluentgrid Limited.

The company helped the Greater Visakhapatnam Municipal Corporation to set up and launched a state-of-the-art centralized City Command Center in 2016.

UPPCL CIS project implemented by the company became the finalist in DCD Global Awards 2018 under the Cloud Migration of the Year category.

In October 2021, the state government of Odisha assigned the company as the system integrator for the newly launched OPTCL's New Electricity Consumer Billing System in Odisha.

The company is credited for conceptualising the Utility Operations Center (UOC) in India. One of its customer care and billing software was live for over 11 million consumers on a cloud pay-as-you-go model for multiple DISCOMs in Uttar Pradesh. It became a case study under the Ujwal DISCOM Assurance Yojana (UDAY program) of the Ministry of Power, presently serving over 23 million rural consumers on cloud. The AMI product suite of Fluentgrid powers smart metering rollouts in New Delhi Municipal Council and Kanpur Electricity Supply Company.

In July 2020, during the COVID-19 pandemic, Fluentgrid developed two portals for the district administration of Visakhapatnam to cater to the testing area and handle the isolation area. It also deployed a COVID-19 emergency response centre for city and state governments.

Subsidiaries

Accreditation 
 SEI CMMI Level 5
 ISO 9001-2015
 ISO/IEC 20000-1: 2011
 ISO/SEC 27001:2013
 ISO 14001
 ISO 45001

Reference 

Software companies of India
Technology companies of India
Companies based in Visakhapatnam
Indian companies established in 1998
Software companies established in 1998
1998 establishments in Andhra Pradesh